Walter Johnson (1887–1946) was an American baseball pitcher.

Walter Johnson may also refer to:

Walter Johnson (defensive tackle) (1942–1999), American football player
Walter Johnson (politician) (1917–2003), British Labour MP for Derby South from 1970 to 1983
Walter Walford Johnson (1904–1987), American businessman and governor of Colorado
Walter Johnson (historian) (born 1967), American academic historian
Walter Johnson (linebacker) (born 1963), American football player
Walter Johnson (academic) (1915–1985), American political scientist and historian
Walter Robert Johnson (1927–1994), Canadian politician
Walter S. Johnson (1884–1978), American businessman and philanthropist
Walter J. Johnson (1611–1703), English explorer and fur trader
Walter J. Johnson (aka Walter Jolowicz; 1908–1996), founder of Academic Press
Walter A. Johnson (c. 1893–1958), American football and basketball coach and college athletics administrator
Wally Johnson (1887–1962), Australian rules footballer

See also
Walter Johnson High School, in Montgomery County, Maryland, US, named for the baseball player
Robert Walter Johnson (1899–1971), American physician and tennis coach
Walter Johnston (disambiguation)